Yatap Station is a station on the Bundang Line between Moran and Imae.  Around the station, there are two big shopping malls: Kim's Club and Homeplus.  Also, Yatap CGV Multiplex and Seongnam Bus Terminal are near the station. The Yatap CGV Multiplex in the basement of the Homeplus is connected by an underground passageway to Yatap Station.

Vicinity
Exit 1: Yatap Middle School, Yatap Post Office
Exit 2: Dolma Elementary School
Exit 3: Bundang Health Center, Bundang Cha Hospital, Tancheon Sports Complex (Home ground of the Seongnam FC)
Exit 4: Seongnam Bus Terminal, Yatap Elementary School

Bundang
Seoul Metropolitan Subway stations
Railway stations opened in 1994
Metro stations in Seongnam